The 2019 UEFA Nations League final was a football match that determined the winners of the final tournament of the 2018–19 UEFA Nations League. It was the inaugural final of the international football competition involving the men's national teams of the member associations of UEFA. The match was held on 9 June 2019 at the Estádio do Dragão in Porto, Portugal, and was contested by hosts Portugal and the Netherlands.

Portugal won the final 1–0 to become the first champions of the UEFA Nations League.

Venue
The final was played at the Estádio do Dragão in Porto—Portugal's second largest city.

The stadium is home to FC Porto.

Background
Ahead of the inaugural final, hosts Portugal held a World Ranking of 7, while opponents the Netherlands were ranked sixteenth.

En route to the Nations League final, the Netherlands beat world champions France—who had won their world title approximately four months prior to their match.

Portugal and the Netherlands beat Switzerland and England respectively in their semi-finals.

Route to the final

Note: In all results below, the score of the finalist is given first (H: home; A: away).

Pre-match

Officials
On 7 June 2019, UEFA announced the appointment of Spaniard Alberto Undiano Mallenco as referee for the final, in what would be his final match as a professional referee. He was joined by compatriots Roberto Alonso Fernández and Juan Yuste Jiménez as assistant referees, Antonio Mateu Lahoz as the fourth official, and Raúl Cabañero Martínez as the reserve official. Alejandro Hernández Hernández served as the video assistant referee and Juan Martínez Munuera as the assistant video assistant referee.

Match

Details

Statistics

References

External links

Final
2019
Portugal national football team matches
2018–19 in Portuguese football
Netherlands national football team matches
2018–19 in Dutch football
Sports competitions in Porto
21st century in Porto
June 2019 sports events in Portugal